Dixonius somchanhae is a species of lizard in the family Gekkonidae. The species is endemic to Laos.

Etymology
The specific name, somchanhae, is in honor of Laotian botanist Somchanh Bounphanmy for her support of biodiversity research in Laos.

Reproduction
The mode of reproduction of D. somchanhae is unknown.

References

Further reading
Nguyen TH, Luu VQ, Sitthivong S, Ngo HT, Nguyen TQ, Le MD, Ziegler T (2021). "A new species of Dixonius (Squamata: Gekkonidae) from Vientiane Capital, Laos". Zootaxa 4965 (2): 351–362. (Dixonius somchanhae, new species).

Dixonius
Reptiles of Laos
Endemic fauna of Laos
Reptiles described in 2021
Taxa named by Truong Quang Nguyen
Taxa named by Thomas Ziegler (zoologist)